Malcolm James Allen (born 29 May 1973) is a former freestyle swimmer who competed for Australia at the 1996 Summer Olympics.  He placed 13th in the 400-metre freestyle, and ended up fourth with the men's 4x200-metre freestyle relay team. A year earlier, at the 1995 FINA Short Course World Championships in Rio de Janeiro, he won the bronze medal in the 400m Freestyle.

On 23 June 2000, Allen was awarded the Australian Sports Medal for his swimming achievements.

References 

1973 births
Living people
Australian male freestyle swimmers
Medalists at the FINA World Swimming Championships (25 m)
Olympic swimmers of Australia
Recipients of the Australian Sports Medal
Sportsmen from New South Wales
Swimmers at the 1996 Summer Olympics